The GHP formalism (or Geroch–Held–Penrose formalism) is a technique used in the mathematics of general relativity that involves singling out a pair of null directions at each point of spacetime. It is a rewriting of the Newman–Penrose formalism which respects the covariance of Lorentz transformations preserving two null directions. This is desirable for Petrov Type D spacetimes, where the pair is made up of degenerate principal null directions, and spatial surfaces, where the null vectors are the natural null orthogonal vectors to the surface.

The New Covariance
The GHP formalism notices that given a spin-frame  with  the complex rescaling  does not change normalization. The magnitude of this transformation is a boost, and the phase tells one how much to rotate. A quantity of weight  is one that transforms like  One then defines derivative operators which take tensors under these transformations to tensors. This simplifies many NP equations, and allows one to define scalars on 2-surfaces in a natural way.

See also

General relativity
NP formalism

References

Mathematical methods in general relativity